Devin Duvernay (born September 12, 1997) is an American football wide receiver and return specialist for the Baltimore Ravens of the National Football League (NFL). He played college football at Texas and was drafted by the Ravens in the third round of the 2020 NFL Draft. Duvernay has earned Pro Bowl honors twice and was a First-team All-Pro in 2021 for his play as a return specialist.

Early years
Duvernay attended Sachse High School in Sachse, Texas. During his high school football career, he had 170 receptions for 2,906 yards and 36 touchdowns. He also holds the school record for  longest kickoff return touchdown with 109 yards, a feat he accomplished as a sophomore. He played in the 2016 Under Armour All-America Game. Duvernay originally committed to Baylor University to play college football but switched to the University of Texas at Austin.

College career
As a true freshman at Texas in 2016, Duvernay played in all 12 games with two starts. He had 20 receptions for 412 yards and three touchdowns. As a sophomore in 2017, he played in all 13 games recording nine receptions for 124 yards. As a junior in 2018, he started all 14 games. For the season, he had 41 receptions for 546 yards and four touchdowns. Duvernay returned to Texas his senior year in 2019 as the number one receiver compiling 1,386 yards receiving as well as nine touchdowns on 106 receptions.

Professional career

Baltimore Ravens
Duvernay was drafted by the Baltimore Ravens in the third round with the 92nd overall pick in the 2020 NFL Draft.

2020 season
Duvernay made his NFL debut in Week 1 against the Cleveland Browns and recorded a 12-yard reception in the 38–6 victory. In Week 3 against the Kansas City Chiefs, he recorded a 93-yard kickoff return for his first career touchdown in the 20–34 loss. In Week 5 against the Cincinnati Bengals, he had a 42-yard rush on a jet sweep to go along with two catches for 17 yards as the Ravens won 27–3. He had three catches for a season-high 45 yards in a 17–23 Week 10 loss to the New England Patriots.

2021 season
Duvernay had a slightly more active role at the beginning of the 2021 season due to injuries to Miles Boykin and Rashod Bateman. In Week 2 against the Kansas City Chiefs, Duvernay recovered a fumble by teammate Ty'Son Williams at the Kansas City two yard line and scored a touchdown. The Ravens would win 36–35. The next week against the Detroit Lions, he had first career receiving touchdown on a 19-yard reception in a 19–17 win. In Week 9 against the Minnesota Vikings, Duvernay recorded his second receiving touchdown on a five-yard reception that he caught one-handed. The Ravens would win 34–31 in overtime. Duvernay was selected to his first pro bowl as a return specialist at the end of the season.

2022 season
The trade of Marquise Brown during the offseason setup Duvernay to be a full-time starter at wide receiver along with Rashod Bateman. He recorded his first multi-touchdown game of his career in 24–9 win Week 1 over the New York Jets, finishing the game with four receptions for 54 yards and two touchdowns. The next week against the Miami Dolphins, he returned the opening kickoff 103 yards for a touchdown. He also had two receptions for 42 yards, but the Ravens would lose, 38–42. He was placed on injured reserve on December 20, 2022 after suffering a severe foot injury during a practice session. He finished the season with a career-high 49 catches for 407 yards and three touchdowns.

NFL career statistics

Personal life
Duvernay is the cousin of Arizona Cardinals quarterback Kyler Murray as well as having a twin brother named Donovan who also played college football at Texas as a defensive back. Donovan transferred to Northwestern State University for his senior season.

References

External links
Baltimore Ravens bio
Texas Longhorns bio

1997 births
Living people
People from Collin County, Texas
People from Denton County, Texas
Players of American football from Texas
Sportspeople from the Dallas–Fort Worth metroplex
American football wide receivers
Texas Longhorns football players
Baltimore Ravens players
American Conference Pro Bowl players